Typhoon Nesat, known in the Philippines as Typhoon Gorio, was a strong tropical cyclone that impacted Taiwan and Fujian, China. It was the ninth named storm and the second typhoon of the annual typhoon season. After consolidating slowly for several days, Tropical Storm Nesat developed east of the Philippines on July 25. While experiencing favorable environmental conditions such as very warm sea surface temperatures and low wind shear, Nesat strengthened into a typhoon and reached its peak intensity on July 28. On July 29, the typhoon made landfall near the Taiwanese city of Yilan, before weakening to a severe tropical storm and making landfall again near Fuqing on China's east coast late the same day. Moving into July 30, Nesat continued to weaken under the effects of land interaction.

Meteorological history

A tropical disturbance accompanied by a broad low-pressure area formed near Palau on July 21; its circulation and associated convection remained elongated and disorganized for the next few days. However, on July 25, the system began to consolidate, with formative convective banding wrapping into its low-level circulation center. As such, the Japan Meteorological Agency (JMA) upgraded it to a tropical depression, and the Joint Typhoon Warning Center (JTWC) issued a Tropical Cyclone Formation Alert shortly after. Meanwhile, PAGASA also stated that the system had intensified into Tropical Depression Gorio. Despite having a partially exposed LLCC, the JTWC also upgraded the system to a tropical depression early on July 26, after scatterometer data and the Dvorak technique revealed sufficient organization. Soon after that, the JMA upgraded the system to a tropical storm and assigned it the international name Nesat while it was located about 600 km (375 mi) east-northeast to Naga, Philippines. Later on July 26, JTWC followed suit and upgraded it to a tropical storm.

Tropical Storm Nesat began to intensify slowly as it tracked generally northwestward along the western edge of an extension of the subtropical ridge centered to the east, aided by a weak anticyclone over the system and a vigorous equatorward outflow channel. By the morning on July 27, the JMA upgraded Nesat to a severe tropical storm. Amid favorable conditions with weakening vertical wind shear and sea surface temperatures of over 31 °C (88 °F) in the area southeast of Taiwan, Nesat intensified into a typhoon at around 06:00 UTC on July 28. Despite a new tropical depression to the west of the typhoon restricting outflow to the west, Nesat strengthened further to reach its peak intensity at around 18:00 UTC, with the central pressure at 960 hPa (28.35 inHg) and ten-minute maximum sustained winds at 150 km/h (90 mph). As Nesat continued to approach Taiwan, animated radar imageries from the Central Weather Bureau (CWB) of Taiwan and microwave imagery depicted a developing eye with strong spiral banding.

Maintaining its peak intensity, Typhoon Nesat made its first landfall over Su'ao, Yilan County in Taiwan at 11:10 UTC and re-emerged over the Taiwan Strait from Zhunan, Miaoli County at 14:30 UTC. The mountainous terrain of Taiwan caused Nesat's convective structure to rapidly decay while cloud tops quickly warmed. At around 21:00 UTC, the JMA downgraded it to a severe tropical storm, and the JTWC downgraded it to a tropical storm. At around 22:00 UTC on July 29, Nesat made its second landfall over Fuqing, Fujian, China. About five hours later, the JTWC issued their final warning on Nesat.

Preparations and impact

Philippines
Even though Typhoon Nesat (Gorio) remained well away from the country, the system enhanced the southwest monsoon which resulted in torrential rains and extreme flooding. Damages reportedly reached ₱247.58 million (US$4.9 million). On July 27, Executive Secretary Salvador Medialdea announces the suspension of work in all government offices and classes in public school at all levels in Metro Manila due to inclement weather.

Taiwan
Before Nesat made landfall, more than 10,000 people, largely from the southern parts of Taiwan, were evacuated and 1,612 were moved into shelters. A total of 145 international flights were cancelled. As Nesat moved inland, it produced strong winds that downed power lines, leaving nearly half a million households without electricity. A total of 111 people were injured when the typhoon hit. Agricultural losses across the country were estimated at $176 million NT (US$5.83 million). Nearly 200 schools across Taiwan were damaged, accounting for about $17.8 million NT (US$588,000) of losses. Together with Tropical Storm Haitang a few days later, a total of $280.5 million NT (US$9.26 million) worth of damage was inflicted on the country.

China

See also

Other typhoons named Nesat
Other typhoons named Gorio
Weather of 2017
Tropical cyclones in 2017
Typhoon Saola (2012)
Typhoon Matmo (2014)
Tropical Storm Morakot (2003)

References

External links

JMA General Information of Typhoon Nesat (1709) from Digital Typhoon

JMA Tropical Cyclone Information of Typhoon Nesat (1709)
11W.NESAT from the U.S. Naval Research Laboratory

2017 disasters in the Philippines
2017 Pacific typhoon season
July 2017 events in Asia
Typhoons in the Philippines
Typhoons in Taiwan
Typhoons in China
Nesat